Ireland West Airport , officially known as Ireland West Airport Knock, commonly known as Knock Airport, is an international airport  south-west of Charlestown, County Mayo, Ireland.

History
The airport opened on 25 October 1985 with three Aer Lingus charter flights to Rome: the official opening was on 30 May 1986. The site, on a hill in boggy terrain, was thought by many to be unrealistic, but the airport was built following a long and controversial campaign by Monsignor James Horan, the story of which has even inspired a musical. The primary motivation was for building it was to attract pilgrims to Knock Shrine. Despite criticisms that the site was too boggy and too foggy, Horan delivered an airport within five years, primarily financed by a Government grant of £9.8 million. He died shortly after the opening of the airport, and his funeral was held at the then-named Horan International Airport. In recent times, Horan has been celebrated with a bronze statue erected at the airport.

By 1988, over 100,000 passengers had passed through. Aer Lingus commenced flights from the airport to Birmingham in 1995.

Recent years

Since 2003, flag-carrier, low-cost and regional airlines including Aer Lingus, MyTravelLite, Bmibaby, Ryanair, Aer Arann, flybe, Lufthansa and EasyJet have added routes to Great Britain and mainland Europe. Not all have proven successful, but by 2005 the airport was handling 500,000 passengers per annum.

It was voted Ireland's best regional airport in 2006 and 2009 by the Chambers of Commerce of Ireland.

2007 was a notable year, with scheduled transatlantic services to New York and Boston commencing in May, operated by the now-defunct Flyglobespan.

A record 629,000 passengers used the airport in 2008, a 13% rise compared to the previous year.

The installation of the Category II Instrument Landing System in April 2009 has resulted in a significant reduction in the number of flight diversions to other airports due to poor visibility – the airport is 200 metres above sea level. August 2009 was the busiest month for three years, with 81,000 passengers: 28 August was the busiest day in the airport's history, with over 4,500 passengers.

In 2011, the month of August was the busiest in the airport's history with 84,052 passengers. 2011 was the most successful year to date with 654,553 passengers. The year saw the commencement of routes to Lanzarote, Tenerife and Gran Canaria operated by Ryanair and to Edinburgh operated by flybe. During September 2011 Ryanair celebrated its four-millionth passenger through the airport, while Lufthansa announced it would be commencing weekly flights to Düsseldorf in May 2012. In November 2011, Ryanair announced flights to Beauvais-Tillé, Frankfurt-Hahn, Bergamo-Orio al Serio and Girona-Costa Brava from March 2012. In January 2012 the 20th scheduled route was announced—flybe to Leeds, its third from the airport, from March 2012. Budget carrier BmiBaby announced in May 2012 that it was to axe its only route to Birmingham from 10 June, owing to the airline's takeover by IAG. Flights to Beauvais-Tillé and Frankfurt-Hahn have since ended.

In 2013, Ryanair launched a weekly summer route to Málaga on Thursdays. Aer Lingus Regional, which took over the Birmingham route operating a daily service using ATR 72s ended service on 26 October. Flybe began four-times-weekly flights on the route on 27 October. On 31 October 2013, in response to the scrapping of the Irish travel tax, Ryanair unveiled three new routes from Knock to Glasgow-Prestwick, Kaunas and Eindhoven. However, these routes had all been withdrawn by the fourth quarter of 2014.

On 16 August 2015, Aer Lingus operated its first transatlantic flight into the airport when carrying members of the Archdiocese of New York, alongside Timothy Cardinal Dolan, Archbishop of New York. Cardinal Dolan subsequently opened the National Novena the following week after a tour around the entire island (all thirty-two counties). The aircraft used for the flight was a Boeing 757-200.

It was announced in November 2017 that €15 million would be invested in improving and upgrading the airport in 2018 and 2019, to coincide with strong passenger growth. These plans include upgrading of car parks, passenger facilities, the terminal and resurfacing of the runway.

On Thursday 20 February 2020, the first Airbus A380 (F-HPJB) to be retired by Air France arrived from Dresden, Germany, for scrapping. The A380 was only ten years old.

Government assistance
The building of the airport was primarily financed by Government grants totaling £9.858 million. The completion of the airport was funded by a £1.3 million grant from the European Union, payable on condition that the airport developers provided an equal sum from their own resources.

On 21 February 2007, the Government of Ireland announced that it was making a €27 million capital grant. The airport stated that it would continue the implementation of its €46 million infrastructural investment programme with over €20 million of spend anticipated for 2008. Work commenced on a number of significant civil and building projects in this year. A€5.5 million extension to the terminal building was completed in April 2009. The implementation of Category II Instrument Landing System (CAT II ILS) on runway 27, to enhance reliability in low visibility, has been completed and approved. An extension to the Runway End Safety Areas (RESAs) and runway turnpad was completed in March 2009.

Departing passengers aged 12 years and over pay a "Development Fee" of €10. The fee is a critical contributor to the ongoing sustainability of the airport and provides a vital funding source to support the ongoing development works of the airport.

In 2005, the airport changed its name to Ireland West Airport Knock. As of August 2009, the Aeronautical Information Publication, including the aeronautical charts available at European Organisation for the Safety of Air Navigation, showed it as Ireland West.

Airlines and destinations

The following airlines operate scheduled and charter flights to and from Ireland West Airport:

Passenger statistics

Passenger numbers

Busiest routes

Ground transport

Road
The airport is near the N17 road, about halfway between Galway and Sligo. It is also close to the N5 Westport to Longford road. Over 1,500 short-term and long-term parking spaces are available at the airport.

Bus
Bus Éireann airport services:
 Route 64: Galway – Derry
 Route 440: Athlone – Westport

Train
The nearest railway stations, accessible by taxi and bus are:
 Ballyhaunis - 
 Foxford - 
 Claremorris - 
 Ballymote - 
The proposed reopening of the Western Rail Corridor from Claremorris onto Sligo would ultimately have closer railway access to the airport.

Taxi
Ireland West Airport is serviced by specially licensed Hackneys and must be pre booked by the laws set down by the National Transport Authority in Ireland.

Car hire
A number of international car rental companies offer rental facilities at Ireland West Airport including Budget, Avis, Europcar and Hertz.

Incidents and accidents
 Incident: Beech Queen-Air 70, N70AA, Sligo Airport, 20 Dec 2005.

 Serious Incident: Boeing B737, EI-DHX, Ireland West Airport, Knock, 23 Mar 2006.

 Accident: Beech 65-A90 King Air, N712DB, Ireland West Airport Knock, 22 August 2006.

 Accident: Beechcraft 77 Skipper, EI-BHT, Kilmovee Co. Mayo, Ireland, 11 May 2008.

 Incident: Cessna 172S, EI-NFW, Ireland West Airport, Knock, Co. Mayo, 28 May 2009.

 Serious Incident: Diamond Twin Star DA42 MNG, G-COBS & Piper PA31-350, G-FCSL 5NM east of Ireland West Airport Knock, Co. Mayo 22 April 2013.

In popular culture
 The construction of the airport is the subject of "Knock Song" by Irish folk singer-songwriter Christy Moore.
 The musical "On a Wing and a Prayer" deals with the life and times of Monsignor Horan, focusing on his struggle to get the airport built. It premièred in The Royal Theatre, Castlebar, on 25 November 2010.
 The airport was used in the film Wild Mountain Thyme in October 2019.

References

External links

 Official website
 
 

1986 establishments in Ireland
Airports in the Republic of Ireland
Airport
Transport in County Mayo